2002 in television may refer to:

2002 in American television
2002 in Australian television
2002 in Austrian television
2002 in Belgian television
2002 in Brazilian television
2002 in British television
2002 in Canadian television
2002 in Chinese television
2002 in Croatian television
2002 in Danish television
2002 in Dutch television
2002 in Estonian television
2002 in French television
2002 in German television
2002 in Greek television
2002 in Irish television
2002 in Italian television
2002 in Japanese television
2002 in Mexican television
2002 in New Zealand television
2002 in Norwegian television
2002 in Philippine television
2002 in Polish television
2002 in Portuguese television
2002 in Scottish television
2002 in South African television
2002 in South Korean television
2002 in Spanish television
2002 in Swedish television
2002 in Thai television